Common names: Cross-banded mountain rattlesnake

Crotalus transversus is a venomous pit viper species found in central Mexico, known from less than 20 specimens. No subspecies are currently recognized.

Description
The length of the tail represents 10.5% of total body length in males and 7.1-7.9% in females.

Geographic range
It is found in central Mexico in the Sierra Ajusco and the Sierra de Monte Alto of the Transverse Volcanic Cordillera in the states of México and Morelos at elevations exceeding  in temperate boreal forests. The type locality given is "about 55 km. SW México (city), near Tres Marías (Tres Cumbres), Morelos [Mexico], elevation about 10,000 ft." (3,000 m)

Conservation status
This species is classified as Least Concern on the IUCN Red List of Threatened Species (v3.1, 2001). Species are listed as such due to their wide distribution, presumed large population, or because they are unlikely to be declining fast enough to qualify for listing in a more threatened category. The population trend was stable when assessed in 2007.

References

Further reading
 Taylor, E.H. 1944. Two New Species of Crotalid Snakes from Mexico. Bull. Chicago Acad. Sci. 30 (4): 47-56.

External links
 

transversus
Reptiles described in 1944